Dischidia platyphylla is a species of plant in the genus Dischidia native to the Philippines. Its name (platyphylla) refers to the flattened leaves, which as it climbs may cling in a shingle-like way to trees, similar to related species like Dischidia imbricata. These leaves are a form of domatia, which act as a shelter for ants in an example of mutualism with ants that is found in several species of Dischidia.

References

Endemic flora of the Philippines
platyphylla
Plants described in 1906